Giacomo Gaioni (26 April 1905 – 14 November 1988) was an Italian cyclist. He won the gold medal in Men's team pursuit in the 1928 Summer Olympics along with Cesare Facciani, Mario Lusiani and Luigi Tasselli.

References

1905 births
1988 deaths
Cyclists at the 1928 Summer Olympics
Olympic cyclists of Italy
Olympic gold medalists for Italy
Italian male cyclists
Olympic medalists in cycling
Cyclists from the Province of Mantua
Medalists at the 1928 Summer Olympics
Italian track cyclists